Little Cranberry Island is an island of roughly  located in the U.S. state of Maine. It is one of the five islands of the Town of Cranberry Isles, Maine.  It has the postal designation Islesford, ZIP 04646.

References

Islands of Hancock County, Maine
Islands of Maine
Coastal islands of Maine